Drabek Peak is a peak,  high, 6 nautical miles (11 km) north of Anare Pass and 9 nautical miles (17 km) west of Redmond Bluff in the Anare Mountains, Victoria Land, Antarctica. The topographical feature was first mapped by the United States Geological Survey from surveys and U.S. Navy aerial photographs, 1960–63, and was named by the Advisory Committee on Antarctic Names for Charles M. Drabek, a United States Antarctic Research Program biologist at McMurdo Station, Hut Point Peninsula, Ross Island, 1964–65 and 1967–68. The peak lies situated on the Pennell Coast, a portion of Antarctica lying between Cape Williams and Cape Adare.

References 

Mountains of Victoria Land
Pennell Coast